The Delaware State League was a minor league baseball league that played briefly in the 1889 season. The five–team Independent level Delaware State League consisted exclusively of teams based in Delaware. The Delaware State League played only the 1889 season.

History
The Delaware State League began minor league play as an Independent five–team league in 1889. The Delaware State League was formed with teams in the Delaware cities of Camden, Dover, Milford, Smyrna and Wilmington as the charter members.

Evolving from local semi–professional baseball, the Delaware State League structure was that each team was allowed to pay eight players and the league had no residency requirements. There was controversy over Dover's signing of Bill Higgins, who had played in 14 major league games for the Boston Beaneaters the previous season. Smyrna management claimed they had also signed Higgins. Dover threatened to fold their franchise over the dispute, before a review of the situation was resolved in favor of Dover.

The Delaware State League began play on July 8, 1889. A crowd of 600 was on hand to see Dover defeat Wilmington in the league opener. Dover started the season with a 5–2 record, just ahead of Wilmington at 4–2, with both losses to Dover. Dover then defeated Wilmington at Wilmington, as the league was beginning to have attendance issues.

After beginning play weeks earlier, the Delaware State League permanently folded on July 25, 1889, before the completion of the 1889 season schedule. Smyrna reportedly couldn't compete with other teams' in player salaries and folded. Within two weeks the entire league folded. The team records and standings on the folding date of July 25, 1889 were: Dover (8–2), Milford (6–5), Wilmington (5–4) Camden (3–6) and Smyrna (1–6).

After the Delaware State League folded, the Wilmington Peach Growers became members of the 1889 Middle States League, another league in the region, that played in only the 1889 season. The Wilmington Peach Growers folded on September 13, 1889, with a 4–9 record. Some sources have the Wilmington team playing as the "Quicksteps."

Delaware State League teams

1889 Delaware State League standings

References

External links
 Baseball Reference

Defunct minor baseball leagues in the United States
Baseball in Delaware
Baseball leagues in Delaware
Sports leagues established in 1889
Sports leagues disestablished in 1889